Ann Hearn (born Ann Neel Simons; June 27, 1953) is an American actress. The daughter of Elizabeth Ann Neel and William “Bill” Simons, she was born in Griffin, Georgia.

Filmography

Film

Television

References 

1953 births
American film actresses
American television actresses
People from Griffin, Georgia
Living people
20th-century American actresses
21st-century American actresses